NGC 6181 is a barred spiral galaxy located in the constellation Hercules. It is designated as SB(rs)c in the galaxy morphological classification scheme and was discovered by William Herschel on 28 April 1788. The galaxy is 107 million light years away.

See also 
 List of NGC objects (6001–7000)

Gallery

References

External links 
 

Barred spiral galaxies
Hercules (constellation)
6181
10439
58470